Sara Field may refer to:

 Sara Bard Field (1882–1974), American poet and suffragist
 Sara Field (rower) (born 1969), American rower